Château Canon may refer to the following notable and smaller wineries:

In Canon-Fronsac:
 Château Canon (Moueix), formerly Pichelèbre
 Château Canon (Horeau)
 Château Canon-de Brem
 Château Canon (de Coninck)
 Château Vrai-Canon-Boyer

In Saint-Émilion:
 Château Canon (Saint-Émilion)
 Château Canon-la-Gaffelière

See also
 Château de Canon, a castle in Normandy